Lieutenant General James Gordon Roudebush, USAF, (born February 24, 1948) was the 19th Surgeon General of the United States Air Force, Headquarters U.S. Air Force, Washington, D.C. General Roudebush served as functional manager of the U.S. Air Force Medical Service. In this capacity, he advised the Secretary of the Air Force and Air Force Chief of Staff, as well as the Assistant Secretary of Defense for Health Affairs on matters pertaining to the medical aspects of the air expeditionary force and the health of Air Force people. General Roudebush had authority to commit resources worldwide for the Air Force Medical Service, to make decisions affecting the delivery of medical services, and to develop plans, programs and procedures to support worldwide medical service missions. He exercised direction, guidance and technical management of more than 42,400 people assigned to 74 medical facilities worldwide.

A native of Gering, Nebraska, Roudebush entered the Air Force in 1975 after receiving a Bachelor of Medicine degree from the University of Nebraska at Lincoln, and a Doctor of Medicine degree from the University of Nebraska College of Medicine. He completed residency training in family practice at the Wright-Patterson Air Force Medical Center, Ohio, in 1978, and aerospace medicine at Brooks Air Force Base, Texas, in 1984. He commanded a wing clinic and wing hospital before becoming Deputy Commander of the Air Force Materiel Command Human Systems Center. He has served as Command Surgeon for U.S. Central Command, Pacific Air Forces, U.S. Transportation Command and Headquarters Air Mobility Command. Prior to his selection as the 19th Surgeon General, he served as the Deputy Surgeon General of the U.S. Air Force.  He retired from the U.S. Air Force on October 1, 2009.

Education
1971 Bachelor of Medicine degree, University of Nebraska at Lincoln
1975 Doctor of Medicine degree, University of Nebraska College of Medicine
1978 Residency training in family practice, Wright-Patterson USAF Medical Center, Wright-Patterson AFB, Ohio
1980 Aerospace Medicine Primary Course, Brooks AFB, Texas
1981 Tri-Service Combat Casualty Care Course, Fort Sam Houston, Texas
1983 Master's of Public Health, University of Texas School of Public Health, San Antonio
1984 Residency in aerospace medicine, Brooks AFB, Texas
1988 Air War College, by seminar
1989 Institute for Federal Health Care Executives, George Washington University, Washington, D.C.
1992 National War College, Fort Lesley J. McNair, Washington, D.C.
1993 Executive Management Course, Defense Systems Management College, Fort Belvoir, Virginia

Assignments
July 1975 – July 1978, resident in family practice, Wright-Patterson USAF Medical Center, Wright-Patterson AFB, Ohio
July 1978 – September 1982, physician in family practice and flight surgeon, USAF Hospital, Francis E. Warren AFB, Wyoming
October 1982 – July 1984, resident in aerospace medicine, USAF School of Aerospace Medicine, Brooks AFB, Texas
August 1984 – September 1986, Chief of Aerospace Medicine, 81st Tactical Fighter Wing, Royal Air Force Bentwaters, England
September 1986 – July 1988, Commander, USAF Clinic, 81st Tactical Fighter Wing, Royal Air Force Bentwaters, England
August 1988 – June 1991, Commander, 36th Tactical Fighter Wing Hospital, Bitburg Air Base, Germany
August 1991 – July 1992, student, National War College, Fort Lesley J. McNair, Washington, D.C.
August 1992 – March 1994, Vice Commander, Human Systems Center, Brooks AFB, Texas
March 1994 – January 1997, Command Surgeon, U.S. Central Command, MacDill AFB, Florida
February 1997 – June 1998, Command Surgeon, Pacific Air Forces, Hickam AFB, Hawaii
July 1998 – July 2000, Commander, 89th Medical Group, Andrews AFB, Maryland
July 2000 – June 2001, Command Surgeon, U.S. Transportation Command and Headquarters Air Mobility Command, Scott AFB, Illinois
July 2001 – July 2006, Deputy Surgeon General, Headquarters U.S. Air Force, Bolling AFB, Washington, D.C.
August 2006 – August 2009, Surgeon General, Headquarters U.S. Air Force, Washington, D.C.

Flight information
Rating: Chief flight surgeon
Flight hours: More than 1,100
Aircraft flown: C-5, C-9, C-21, C-130, EC-135, F-15, F-16, H-53, KC-135, KC-10, T-37, T-38, UH-1 and UH-60

Awards and decorations

Effective dates of promotion

Professional memberships and associations
Society of USAF Flight Surgeons
Aerospace Medical Association
International Association of Military Flight Surgeon Pilots
Association of Military Surgeons of the United States
Air Force Association
American College of Preventive Medicine
American College of Physician Executives
American Medical Association

References

Biography of Lt. Gen. Roudebush current as of May 2008

Surgeons General of the United States Air Force
Recipients of the Legion of Merit
George Washington University alumni
Living people
1948 births
Recipients of the Defense Superior Service Medal
People from Gering, Nebraska